Thookku Thookki is a 1954 Indian Tamil-language historical drama film directed by R. M. Krishnaswami. Based on the play of the same name by Udumalai Narayana Kavi, it stars Sivaji Ganesan, Lalitha and Padmini. The film revolves around a prince who, after hearing about the five maxims of life, goes through numerous adventures to evaluate their validity.

Thookku Thookki is the second film adaptation of the play, following a 1935 film. It was released on 26 August 1954 and became a success, besides winning two Chennai Film Fans' Association awards: Best Film, and Best Actor (Ganesan).

Plot 
The king of Sundarapuri advises his three sons to get into business and earn money to save the crippling economy. Sundarangathan is the brightest son while the other two are dimwitted. Hence, the king looks up to him for support to save the country. All the three brothers venture out of their country to do business.

Sundarangathan visits a research centre and listens to the words of pandits. One of them reads out the five maxims of life:
 A father cares only for the riches earned by his son.
 Only a mother stands by the son through good and bad times.
 A sister values her brother only for the gift he brings her.
 A wife may even kill her husband.
 A friend in need is a friend indeed.

Sundarangathan is sceptical, and argues with the pandits before deciding to evaluate their validity. Instead of pursuing his business goal, Sundarangathan returns to Sundarapuri to verify the merits of the maxims, but his father again sends him away and prohibits him from returning without riches, convincing Sundarangathan that the first maxim is true.

Sundarangathan visits his mother who warmly welcomes him and is upset to know the reaction of his father. She offers him protection, advises him to stay back in the palace and promises that she will pacify the king. Sundarangathan refuses, but realises the second maxim is true.

Sundarangathan goes to his sister's country. His sister and her husband welcome him warmly. However, on realising that he did not bring any gifts or riches for her, she feels humiliated and disrespects him. Sundarangathan is forced to leave, but realises the third maxim is true.

Sundarangathan meets his wife Prema, who stayed back in her father's kingdom Sorgapuri as Sundarangathan was regularly travelling outside his kingdom. Sundarangathan is not aware that Prema is having an extramarital affair with Seth Namakharam, and is staying back in the place for this reason. Madhivanan, son of the minister and a friend of Sundarangathan, learns of the affair and visits Prema's palace twice to verify the same. However, she lies to Sundarangathan that Madhivanan is misbehaving by coming to her place regularly, misusing his friendship.

Sundarangathan reprimands Madhivanan, who reveals the affair and tells him to check for himself. Sundarangathan infiltrates Namakharam's services as a menial worker and gains his confidence. When Prema invites Namakharam to her palace, Sundarangathan accompanies him. Namakharam presents her a betel leaf, prepared by the worker. She notices that the folding is in Sundarangathan's style. Suspicious, she asks Namakharam who says the worker joined the day before. Prema sends her assistant to kill the worker, convincing Sundarangathan that the fourth maxim is true. He reveals his true identity to Prema and Namakharam.

Prema lies to her father that Sundarangathan attempted to kill her. Sundarangathan, accused of attempted murder, flees to another kingdom where he feigns insanity. However, he attracts the attention of princess Madhavi, who likes his behaviour and arranges for his treatment. When he is "cured", she makes him her and her sister Mallika's baggage carrier. Kattazhagan, their teacher's son, falls in love with Madhavi and demands that she should marry him. Sundarangathan comes to her rescue. The king learns that Sundarangathan is not insane, and that he is the prince of Sundarapuri who is banned there. He arrests Sundarangathan, but after Madhavi pleads, agrees to release him if his innocence is proven.

Sundarangathan is taken to Sorgapuri. When his father-in-law demands to know why he ran away, he is forced to reveal the details of Prema's affair. The king asks for proof. By then, Madhivanan brings Namakharam who confesses all. Prema's assistant also confirms it. Prema realises her mistake and accepts her crime, says that Sundarangathan should marry Madhavi and commits suicide. The king apologises to Sundarangathan and appoints him king. Sundarangathan's father reaches with his wife and sons and apologises for ill-treating Sundarangathan. Madhavi's father offers Madhavi to Sundarangathan. Sundarangathan explains his pursuit to find the validity of the maxims and getting them confirmed. At his request, Mallika marries Madhivanan while Sundarangathan marries Madhavi.

Cast 

Male cast
 Sivaji Ganesan as Sundarangathan (Thookku Thookki)
 T. S. Balaiah as Seth Namakharam
 R. Balasubramaniam as Mangalapuri King
 P. B. Rangachari as Swarnapuri King
 G. Muthukrishnan as Madhivanan
 T. N. Sivathanu as Chithran
 S. S. Sivasoorian as Vichithran
 Yadhartham Ponnusami Pillai as Instructor
 Venkatraman as Class Leader (Handsome)
 Venkatachalam as Sundarapuri King

Male cast (continued)
 Ramaiah as Mathanan
 Loose Arumugam as Thookku Thookki
 Dakshanamurthi as Lakshman
 Ramaraj as Scholar
 Veerasami as Scholar
 P. Kalayanam as Sundarapuri Minister
 V. P. S. Mani as Managalapuri Minister
 Kanaiah as Sepoy
 Villan Natarajan as Sepoy
 Shanmugam as Sepoy

Female cast
 Lalitha as Sundarangathan's wife, Prema
 Padmini as Rajakumari, Madhavi
 Ragini as Minister's daughter, Mallika
 C. K. Saraswathi as Sundarapuri Queen
 M. S. S. Bhagyam as Perundevi
 Chellam as Guna Sundari
 Venu Bai as Mangalapuri Queen

Production 
Thookku Thookki was an adaptation of the play of the same name by Udumalai Narayana Kavi which was previously made into a film in 1935. The film was directed by R. M. Krishnaswami, who also handled the cinematography, and produced by M. Radhakrishnan. The dialogue was written by A. T. Krishnasamy and V. N. Sambandham. Editing was handled by R. M. Venugopal.

Soundtrack 
The music was composed by G. Ramanathan, with lyrics by Udumalai Narayana Kavi, Thanjai N. Ramaiah Dass and A. Maruthakasi. In less than 12 hours, Narayana Kavi wrote five of the eight songs, which were composed immediately by Ramanathan and rehearsed by the playback singers. T. M. Soundararajan was hired to sing the songs picturised on Ganesan at Maruthakasi's recommendation, with his salary being . Ganesan objected to Soundararajan and wanted his usual singer C. S. Jayaraman instead, but Soundararajan persuaded Ganesan to let him render the songs, and he would leave if Ganesan was not satisfied. After hearing Soundararajan's rendering, Ganesan was impressed and Soundararajan went on to sing many songs for Ganesan. The song "Sundari Soundari" is set in the Carnatic raga known as Kurinji, and "Pengalai Nambaadhe Kangale" is set in Maand.

Release and reception 
Thookku Thookki was released on 26 August 1954. Despite facing competition from another Ganesan film released on the same day (Koondukkili), it became a commercial success. The film won two Chennai Film Fans' Association awards: Best Film, and Best Actor (Ganesan).

References

Bibliography

External links 
 

1950s Tamil-language films
1954 films
Films scored by G. Ramanathan
Indian black-and-white films
Indian films based on plays
Indian historical drama films
1950s historical drama films